Candidula codia is a species of air-breathing land snail, a terrestrial pulmonate gastropod mollusk in the family Geomitridae, the hairy snails and their allies.

References

 Bourguignat, J.-R. (1860). Aménités Malacologiques. § LXXVI. Helix codia. Revue et Magasin de Zoologie. (2) 11
 Bank, R. A.; Neubert, E. (2017). Checklist of the land and freshwater Gastropoda of Europe. Last update: July 16th, 2017
 Gittenberger, E. (1993). Digging in the graveyard of synonymy, in search of Portuguese species of Candidula Kobelt, 1871 (Mollusca: Gastropoda Pulmonata: Hygromiidae). Zoologische Mededelingen. 67(17): 283-293. Leiden

codia
Gastropods described in 1859